Orca Symphony No. 1 is the fourth studio album by Armenian-American musician Serj Tankian. The album takes the form of a classical symphony. A professionally sampled studio version was released on November 30, 2012, while the live recorded version was released on June 25, 2013, through Serjical Strike Records.

A sample of the first act of the album was released on Tankian's SoundCloud page in May 2012.

Background
Tankian achieved fame as part of the American rock band System of a Down. Although the band experimented with various sounds, it wasn't until the band went on hiatus in 2006 that Tankian began to launch his solo career and experiment further.

Tankian's experimentation with classical composition began with Elect the Dead Symphony. The live album featured the Auckland Philharmonia Orchestra performing reworked versions of songs from Tankian's debut album Elect the Dead. His second album, Imperfect Harmonies, blended classical with traditional rock elements. Tankian described the album as "music that has sat in the vat and matured", referring to the album's influences from several genres.

Orca Symphony No. 1, however, is his first complete symphony. The album is structured into four acts that were composed using "non-traditional approaches to classical music." According to Tankian, "Orca is known as the killer whale, but is really a dark dolphin, a symbolism for human dichotomy."

Track listing

References

Serj Tankian albums
Reprise Records albums
2013 classical albums
Albums produced by Serj Tankian
Serjical Strike Records albums
21st-century symphonies